The 2018–19 Iranian Futsal Super League are the 20th season of the Iran Pro League and the 15th under the name Futsal Super League. Mes Sungun are the defending champions. The season will feature 12 teams from the 2017–18 Super League and two new teams promoted from the 2017–18 1st Division: Sunich and Ahoora.

Teams

Stadia, locations and Personnel

Number of teams by region

League standings 
</noinclude><noinclude>

Positions by round

Results table

Championship playoffs

Calendar

Bracket

Awards 

 Winner: Mes Sungun
 Runners-up: Giti Pasand
 Third-Place: Melli Haffari
 Top scorer:  Mahdi Javid (Giti Pasand) (37 goals)
 Best Player: 
 Best Manager: 
 Best Goal Keeper: 
 Best Team: 
 Fairplay Man: 
 Best Referee:

References

External links 
 Futsal Planet 
 Iranian Futsal News Agency 

Iranian Futsal Super League seasons
1